Wedding Night in the Rain is a 1967 East German musical romantic comedy film, directed by Horst Seemann and starring Frank Schöbel, Traudl Kulikowsky, and Herbert Köfer.

Plot

The plot centers around Gabi, a hairdresser hailing from the Baltic coast, who has her heart set on becoming East Germany's first-ever female jockey. To achieve her goal, Gabi relocates to Berlin, where she weds Freddy, a motorcyclist. Her aspirations take shape when a benevolent stableman permits her to train in secret. Nevertheless, her attempts are met with rejection by the head coach at Hoppegarten.

Critics have lauded the movie, citing it as an exquisite, captivating, and extraordinary piece of cinema. The Czech version of the film boasts remarkable design work by Zdenek Ziegler.

Cast

References

Bibliography

External links
 

1967 films
East German films
1960s German-language films
Films set in Berlin
Films shot in Berlin
Films shot in Budapest
German horse racing films
German musical films
German romantic comedy films
1960s German films